"Rip It Up" is a rock and roll song written by Robert Blackwell and John Marascalco. In June 1956, Specialty Records released it as a single by Little Richard with "Ready Teddy" as the B-side. The song reached the top position on the Billboard Rhythm & Blues Records chart as well as number 17 on the magazine's broader Billboard Hot 100. The version peaked at number 30 in the UK Singles Chart.

The tenor saxophone solo is by Lee Allen.

Also in 1956, Bill Haley and his Comets released a version of the song. Their version reached number 25 on the Hot 100, and number four in the UK Singles Chart.

The song, which was recorded at J&M Recording Studio in New Orleans, is included as a full-length performance by Earl Palmer with guest vocalist Ivan Neville and house band in the 2005 documentary film Make It Funky!, which presents a history of New Orleans music and its influence on rhythm and blues, rock and roll, funk and jazz. Los Lobos recoded the song for the 1987 Ritchie Valens biography film La Bamba (film) The song hasn't been officially released on the album but is released on their album El Cancionero Mas y Mas

References

1956 singles
Little Richard songs
Bill Haley songs
Songs written by Robert Blackwell
Songs written by John Marascalco
1956 songs
Specialty Records singles